Italian-American cuisine is a style of Italian cuisine adapted throughout the United States. Italian-American food has been shaped throughout history by various waves of immigrants and their descendants, called Italian Americans.

As immigrants from the different regions of Italy settled throughout the various regions of the United States, many brought with them a distinct regional Italian culinary tradition. Many of these foods and recipes developed into new favorites for the townspeople and later for Americans nationwide.

Traditional influences

Italian-American food is based primarily on the culinary traditions of Southern Italian immigrants, although a significant number of Northern Italian immigrants also came to the United States and also influenced this style of cuisine to some extent.

Most of these immigrants arrived in the United States during the late 19th and early 20th centuries, and during this time, many Italians coming from Naples and Sicily moved to large American cities, such as New York City, Boston, Philadelphia, Cleveland, Chicago, St. Louis, Los Angeles, and San Francisco; the immigrant cuisine is thus largely derived from Neapolitan and Sicilian cuisine, and is particularly associated with these locations.

Italian-Americans often identify foods with their regional heritage. Southern Italian staples include dry pasta, tomato sauce, and olive oil, whereas Northern Italian staples include foods such as risotto, white sauce and polenta.

Over time, through an increased appreciation of Italian cuisine in the United States, as well as increased imports into the United States from Italy, there has been a push towards producing more authentic dishes, which use techniques and ingredients that are more native to Italy.

American cuisine has readily received innovations from Italy, such as espresso (which evolved into specialty coffee drinks, now ubiquitous in American life), tiramisu, and Nutella.

On the other hand, e.g. pasta alla carbonara, a dish unrecorded in Italy before World War II, may be due to an American influence in relationship to the allied liberation of Rome in 1944. Many Italians then were happy to use powdered eggs and bacon supplied by the United States and their armed forces for pasta dishes.

Popularity of Italian-American cuisine
Italian-American food and Mediterranean cuisine has been highly influential in the American diet. It is one of the top three cuisines in the United States, according to the National Restaurant Association:

Rated high on the list of popular, or trending, items in the survey include Mediterranean flatbread, ciabatta bread, espresso and specialty coffee drinks. Pizza and pasta are also common dishes in the United States; however, they are often presented in very different forms than in Italy.

Italian-American cuisine and wine
There is a strong association between Italian-American cuisine with the history of winemaking in the United States.

Many Italian wines were first introduced to the United States in the late 1700s. Italian vintners were first brought to the state of Florida in 1766 by Dr. Andrew Turnbull, a British Consul at Smyrna (now Izmir). Philip Mazzei, an Italian physician, and close friend of U.S. President Thomas Jefferson, also helped to cultivate vineyards, olives, and other Mediterranean fruit with the help of Italians.

In later years, American viticulture was more influenced by the Italian diaspora of the transatlantic migrations, which steadily brought more Italians to America from the 1870s through the 1920s. Most of these Italians entered the East Coast of the United States through Ellis Island, whereas many of those quickly passed through to the American West Coast, where California still had its famous "Gold Rush".

In California, Italian-Americans were inspired by the expanse of rolling hills and fertile fields. Prior to Prohibition starting in 1919, many wineries had made their start: Seghesio, Simi, Sebastiani Vineyards and Foppiano began in the late 19th century and remain in operation today. Others included Giuseppe Magliavacca's Napa winery, Secondo Guasti's Italian Vineyard Company and Andrea Sbarbaro's Italian-Swiss Colony.

From 1919 until the repeal of Prohibition in 1933, many Italian-Americans struggled to keep their vineyards going. Many remained through providing sacramental wine to the Catholic Church or grape juice to the general market. These few holdouts can be credited with salvaging America's viticulture heritage, in an industry that values the longevity and tradition of the vine and its produce.

Today, Italian-American wineries prove a powerful asset on the world market. Some of these companies include: Atlas Peak (also known as Antinori), Cosentino, Dalla Valle, Delicato, Ferrari-Carano, E & J Gallo Winery, Geyser Peak, Louis M. Martini, Mazzocco, Robert Mondavi, Monte Bello Ridge, Corrado Parducci, Pedroncelli Winery, Robert Pepi, Picchetti Brothers Winery, Rochioli, Rafanelli, Rubicon Estate Winery (also known as Francis Ford Coppola Presents), Sebastiani Vineyards, Signorello, Sattui, Trinchero (most often under the Sutter Home brand), Valley of the Moon, Viansa, and more.

Dishes

Pastas and grains
 American chop suey—a distant relative of ragù bolognese made primarily with hamburger meat
 Baked ziti—ziti pasta, originally from Sicily, tube-shaped pasta similar to penne but much longer, mixed with a tomato sauce and covered in cheese, then baked in the oven
 Lasagna, particularly using ricotta, called lasagne alla napoletana in Italy. The ricotta distinguishes it from the original and better-known (outside the U.S.) North Italian style that uses béchamel sauce, called  lasagne alla bolognese or just lasagne
 Penne alla vodka—the sauce of this pasta dish consists of tomato, onion, prosciutto, cream and vodka
 Spaghetti and meatballs—a dish based on Neapolitan festival dishes involving much smaller meatballs as well as other ingredients, iconic in the United States. The dish as served in the United States is unknown in Italy. Meatballs (polpette) are not served on top of pasta in Italy.

Vegetable dishes
 Eggplant parmesan or melanzane alla parmigiana is a common Italian dish. It typically includes sliced eggplant, marinara sauce, and cheese, layered repeatedly. It is never served on or with spaghetti in Italy and there are no meat "parmigianas" though zucchini- and artichoke-based versions do exist.
 Peas and eggs or piselli cacio e uova, originally a meal eaten by poor Italian immigrants has since become a favorite lenten meal. It consists of simply eggs and peas, fried in a pan with olive oil and some garlic, onion and pepper.

Meats and eggs
 Frittata—An open-faced omelette containing meat, cheese, potatoes, peas, asparagus, peppers, cucuzza (i.e., squash), onions, and other vegetables, alone or in combination. These can be eaten by themselves or on sandwiches.
 Sausage and peppers—Salsiccia, peppers and onions cooked together, sometimes with a very light red sauce.
 Porchetta, also known as "porketta," Italian roast pork, roast pork, roast pork sandwich, or Italian pulled pork depending on the region of the U.S. Roast pork butt or shoulder; often a full suckling pig. Traditionally a holiday or celebration dish or found at festivals or fairs. However, it is commonly eaten in a sandwich form, usually with broccoli rabe, in Philadelphia's Italian-American communities and in recent times throughout the city. Brought to America mostly by immigrants from Abruzzo, as well as those from Lazio (especially the Alban Hills), Marche, and Tuscany.
 Chicken (or Veal) Parmesan—fried breaded chicken or veal cutlets covered in sauce and cheese, served with pasta. A very popular dish in casual dining restaurants, as well as a sandwich filling. The name of this dish is often abbreviated to "parm".
 Chicken marsala—chicken cutlets, mushrooms, and Marsala wine.
 Chicken Francese was developed by Italian American restaurateurs after the Second World War, when French food became popular after GIs returning from France had developed a taste for it.

Sauces
 Alfredo sauce—derived from the Fettuccine Alfredo made popular by Roman restaurateur Alfredo di Lelio starting in 1914. American Alfredo sauce consists largely of cream, butter, and Parmigiano-Reggiano cheese with nutmeg and black pepper seasonings, and is served over vegetables and some meats (particularly chicken and shellfish) as well as the signature pasta ribbons. The authentic Alfredo dish only consists of fettuccine pasta, butter and parmigiano reggiano. The primary difference between authentic fettuccine Alfredo and Alfredo sauce is that while the pasta dish is prepared by adding ingredients to the cooked pasta, Alfredo sauce is prepared in bulk and poured over pasta or other ingredients (vegetables such as broccoli and meats such as shrimp or grilled chicken are common additions). Though very popular in the United States, this sauce is virtually unheard of in Italy.
 Marinara sauce—a quick-cooking, sometimes spicy tomato sauce without meat served on pasta. Salsa al pomodoro is the usual Italian name.
 Bolognese sauce—a meat-based sauce originating from Bologna, Italy.
 Sunday sauce—a meat-infused tomato sauce commonly made on Sundays and special occasions; derived from the Italian ragù napoletano. In some areas, including Boston, New Jersey, and Philadelphia, it is sometimes called "gravy".

Seafood dishes
 Lobster Fra Diavolo—a pasta dish made with lobster, sometimes other seafood, that contains crushed red pepper to make it spicy.
 Baccalà—salt cod fish, traditionally served during Lent or for Christmas Eve. Can be fried, baccalà salad, so on.
 Alici or Acciughe—another integral dish served during Christmas Eve's Feast of the Seven Fishes. This dish's full name is spaghetti con aglio, olio e acciughe (spaghetti with garlic, oil, and anchovies; alici is another word for anchovy). The anchovies and garlic are sliced very thin and dissolve in the oil. When served, the dish appears to be just pasta covered in hot oil. (Many variants exist in Italy: some don't have anchovies, some add capers or chili pepper.)

Soups and stews
 Cioppino—a fish stew characteristic of West Coast Italian American cookery, particularly San Francisco.
 Wedding soup—a soup with meatballs or sausage and pasta in a chicken broth.
 Pasta e fagioli (or "pasta fazool" in Italian-American slang, from Southern Italian fasule ("beans") instead of standard Italian fagioli)—pasta with beans, often cannellini beans, that has the consistency of a stew.

Breads, sandwiches, and savory baked goods

 Calzone and stromboli—while the half-moon shaped Italian calzone is well known in the United States, the very similar tube-shaped stromboli as well as large, loaf-like calzones served in slices are also fairly common.
 Italian bread—Perhaps a bit closer to French bread in composition and appearance, American "Italian bread" is a lean white bread, often braided and covered in sesame seeds, with a thin but usually crisp crust and a soft crumb. American "Italian bread" does not particularly resemble many traditional Italian bread forms, but is very popular in both loaf form and roll form, where it is often closely associated with sandwich making. A regional variety of this is Scali.
 Pizza—the most common form of American pizza is based on (and called) the Neapolitan style, the earliest and essentially standard version of which is commonly called New York-style. Also popular in America is a version of the Sicilian pizza, a larger square pizza in which the dough is risen an inch or more, and which is topped (contrary to native Sicilian tradition) in much the same way as the thin-crusted round Neapolitan form, including the use of mozzarella. Even more Americanized forms such as Greek pizza, apizza (i.e. New Haven-style pizza) and Chicago-style have become common.
 Submarine sandwich—originated in several different Italian American communities in the Northeastern United States from the late 19th to mid-20th centuries.
 Muffuletta—a large sandwich with cold cuts and olive salad, made on a round loaf; originated in New Orleans.
 Italian beef sandwich—a type of roast beef sandwich native to Chicago, similar to a French dip sandwich.
 Italian sandwich
 Meatball sandwich
 Pizzagaina,  pizza ghen or pizza rustica—Easter pie, made with various cheeses, eggs, and salted meats. Compare , from Liguria, or the Italian-Argentine version, torta pascualina. Pizzagaina may also be called pasteed or pastiere, although it is more of a quiche than pie unlike pizzagaina.

Sweets
 Tiramisu—a sweet multi-layered cake with a light fluffy cream, often served with a coffee or other hot caffeinated beverage. Tiramisu is one of the more recent Italian imports, having been invented after World War II (probably in the Veneto region), but adopted readily by American diners.
 Cannoli—a sweet ricotta filling in a fried pastry shell.
 Struffoli (or Struf')—Fried dough for dessert. Christmas cake typical of Naples. In Abruzzo, this dish is called cicerchiata, meaning "blue sweet-pea dish" and is eaten before Easter.
 Biscotti d'annodare—knot cookies.
 Sfogliatelle—a sort of custard turnover made with leaved (millefoglie) pastry; a similar pastry, larger and filled with a type of pastry cream, is sometimes called a "lobster tail".
 Biscotti—generally anise flavored, often nut-studded hard cookie that may alternatively contain dried fruit or chocolate are common as well; often dipped in coffee rather than sweet dessert wines as in Italy. American biscotti are almost always loaf-type cookies that are sliced and rebaked to crispness, while the term refers to almost all forms of cookie in Italy.
 Pizzelle—traditional Italian waffle cookies made from flour, eggs, sugar, butter or oil, and flavoring (usually anise or anisette, less commonly vanilla or lemon zest). Originally from Abruzzo, brought over to the United States by Abruzzese immigrants. Popular during Christmas in the Northeastern United States among Italian-Americans and especially in Philadelphia and other cities where large numbers of Abruzzese immigrants settled.

See also

Italian cuisine
Cuisine of the United States
North American cuisine
Culinary revolution
New American cuisine
Mediterranean cuisine

References

Further reading
There are many styles of cookbooks available in English, both on the subjects of traditional and authentic "Italian cuisine" and "Italian American" food.
Bastianich, Lidia Matticchio, Lidia's Italian American Kitchen. New York, New York: Alfred A. Knopf, 2001. Focuses on the Italian American kitchen and also the basis of the PBS television cooking show series. Winner of the IACP cookbook Award. Bastianich incorporates Northern Italian and Istrian Slavic influences in her cooking.
Buonopane, Marguerite D., The North End Italian Cookbook, 5th ed. Guilford, CT: Globe Pequot Press, 2004, : An oft-updated collection of Italian American recipes from Boston, Massachusetts.
De Laurentiis, Giada, Giada's Family Dinners. New York, New York: Crown Publishing Group/ Random House, Inc., 2006,  or 0-307-23827-X: By the star of television Food Network's Everyday Italian and Behind the Bash, De Laurentiis' cooking style bridges the gap between Italian and Italian American food.
Editoriale Domus (editor), The Silver Spoon (original title, "Il cucchiaio d'argento"). London: Phaidon Press, 2005, : An English translation of a best-selling Italian kitchen reference providing a broad survey of the dishes popular around Italy; provided for comparison with the references about American Italian food.
Gabaccia, Donna, "Food, Recipes, Cookbooks, and Italian American Life" pp. 121–155 in American Woman, Italian Style, Fordham Press, 2011. .
Gentile, Maria, The Italian Cook Book: The Art of Eating Well. New York: The Italian Book Co., 1919: A post-World War I effort to popularize Italian cooking in the United States.
Hill, Henry, The Wiseguy Cookbook. New York: Penguin-Putnam, 2002, : A presentation of the role of food in the life of the American Mafia by the subject of the movie Goodfellas.
Mariani, John and Galina, The Italian American Cookbook. Boston: Harvard Common Press, 2000, : A broad history and survey of Italian American food as eaten around the United States.
Middione, Carlo, The Food of Southern Italy. New York: William Morrow & Company, 1987,  (hardcover). A San Franciscan chef's perspective on Italian food.
Rice, William, Steak Lover's Cookbook. New York: Workman Publishing, 1997, . Not an Italian cookbook, but talks extensively about the influence of Italian American cuisine on steakhouse culture and menus.
Rucker, Alan, and Michele Scicolone, The Sopranos Family Cookbook. New York: Warner Books, 2002, : A tie-in to the popular HBO television series, featuring recipes typical of Neapolitan-derived New Jersey Italian American food (the fictional Soprano family claimed descent from the town of Avellino).

On Italian American Winemaking
Wine Heritage: The Story of Italian American Vintners. Dick Rosano (Author), Robert Mondavi (Foreword).

On Related topics of migration, immigration and diaspora

Worrall, Janet E, et al. editors, Italian Immigrants Go West: the Impact of Locale on Ethnicity.  Cambridge, MA: Italian American Historical Association (AIHA), 2003,  (hardcover) or 0-934675-51-X (softcover): an anthology of essays on Italian Americans, including subjects of history, literature, ethnic relations, movement west in America, early 19th Century migration from Italy, politics, urban/ suburban/ rural living, typical labor and work life, etc.
Gabaccia, Donna R., Italy's Many Diasporas.  Seattle, WA: University of Washington Press, 2000,  or 0-295-97918-6 (alk. paper): Foreign countries, emigration and immigration. See essays on "Patria e natio" (29), "legacy of civilta italiana" (33), table 3.3. "Destinations of migrants by region, 1876-1914 by percentage" (70), "Paese, regione and the global labor market" (68). This book will also help better understand the concepts of community among working Italian Americans with the ideas of "paese" or "paesani," and the shared, formative culture among them, often referred to as "civilita italiana."

External links
 Italian American recipes by La Gazzetta Italiana
 FOODS OF AFFECTION ISSUE SPRING 2008 Italian Americana: The voice of leading cultural, intellectual and literary Italian Americans
 To Make Pizza - How To Make Pizza Dough

 
Italian cuisine
Articles containing video clips